Nythe, Eldene and Liden is a civil parish in the eastern suburbs of the town of Swindon, England. In addition to the residential areas of Nythe (in the north), Eldene and Liden (southwest and southeast), the parish has the Dorcan industrial area.

History and governance
The Ordnance Survey map of 1948 shows the area as farmland. In the 1960s, as part of Swindon's eastward expansion, the entire area became a privately built housing estate.

Following a Community Governance Review in 2013, Nythe obtained independence from Stratton St Margaret, becoming a parish in its own right with effect from 1 April 2015. After a further review in 2016, the parish was extended to include Eldene and Liden, which were previously unparished areas; from 1 April 2017 the name of the parish is Nythe, Eldene and Liden. The parish council has nine members, and its main responsibility is grounds maintenance, in particular in play areas.

Swindon Borough Council is the unitary authority for the area; Nythe and Dorcan fall within Covingham and Dorcan ward, while Eldene and Liden are part of Liden, Eldene and Park South ward. For Westminster elections, Nythe is in North Swindon constituency and the rest of the parish is in South Swindon.

Geography
The Dorcan Stream (a small tributary of the River Cole) forms the western boundary in the south, then turns east to separate Nythe from the rest of the parish. Dorcan Way, part of Swindon's B4006 orbital road, is the northern boundary of Nythe and continues in an arc through the parish to meet the A4259 Marlborough Road, which marks the southern boundary. The eastern boundary is the A419 road, a major route which connects the nearby junction 15 of the M4 motorway with north Swindon and Gloucestershire.

Amenities
The parish has a community centre, a primary school and Nyland Campus, a primary school for children with special needs. Dorcan Academy, a secondary school for ages 11 to 16, is within the parish.

References

External links

 Nythe, Eldene and Liden Parish Council

Civil parishes in Wiltshire
Borough of Swindon